Utah is a state in the United States of America. Its government consists of a state executive, legislative, and judicial branch, laid forth by the Constitution and law of the State of Utah.

Executive Branch

The executive powers of government are vested in the Governor.  The current governor is Spencer Cox, a Republican. Gary Herbert, the previous governor, assumed the governorship on August 11, 2009, following the resignation of Governor Jon Huntsman, Jr., who was appointed United States Ambassador to China by President Barack Obama. Herbert was elected for a further four-year term in 2012 and 2016. In 2019, Herbert announced he would not seek a third full term in 2020, and endorsed then-Lieutenant Governor Cox for governor. In the 2020 Utah gubernatorial election, Cox was elected governor, after first defeating former Governor Jon Huntsman, Jr., former Utah GOP chair Thomas Wright, and former Utah House Speaker Greg Hughes in the Republican primary, then defeating Democratic nominee Chris Peterson in the general election.

Officers

The Governor's Cabinet consists of the following appointees, who are the heads of the agencies listed:

 Executive Director, Utah Department of Administrative Services
 Commissioner, Utah Department of Agriculture and Food
 Executive Director, Utah Department of Corrections
 Chief Information Officer for the State of Utah, Utah Department of Technology Services
 Executive Director, Utah Department of Commerce
 Executive Director, Utah Department of Environmental Quality
 Commissioner, Utah Department of Financial Institutions
 Executive Director, Utah Governor's Office of Economic Development
 Executive Director, Utah Department of Health
 Executive Director, Utah Department of Human Resource Management
 Executive Director, Utah Department of Human Services
 Commissioner, Utah Insurance Department
 Adjutant General of Utah, Utah National Guard
 Executive Director, Utah Department of Natural Resources
 Commissioner, Utah Department of Public Safety
 Executive Director, Utah Department of Transportation
 Executive Director, Utah Department of Community and Culture
 Executive Director, Utah Department of Workforce Services
 Executive Director, Utah Department of Veteran Affairs
 Chairperson, Utah Board of Pardons and Parole
 Commissioner, Utah Labor Commission
 Commissioner, Utah State Tax Commission

Legislative Branch

The legislative powers of government are vested in the Senate, House of Representatives and the people. Both the Utah Senate and the Utah House of Representatives have a Republican majority.

Utah State Senate

Leadership

President: Stuart Adams (R-22)

Majority (Republican) Leadership

 Majority Leader: Evan Vickers (R-28)
 Majority Whip: Ann Millner (R-18)

Minority (Democratic) Leadership

 Minority Leader: Karen Mayne (D-5)
 Minority Whip: Luz Escamilla (D-1)

Utah State House of Representatives

Leadership

 Speaker of the House: Brad Wilson (R-15)

Majority (Republican) Leadership

 Majority Leader: Francis D. Gibson (R-65)
 Majority Whip: Mike Schultz (R-12)

Minority (Democratic) Leadership

 Minority Leader: Brian King (D-28)
 Minority Whip: Karen Kwan (D-34)

Judicial Branch

The judicial powers of government are vested in a Supreme Court, district courts, and other courts of record.

Supreme Court

District Courts

References

 
Utah